Hemiarrhena is a monotypic genus of flowering plants belonging to the family Linderniaceae. The only species is Hemiarrhena plantaginea.

Its native range is Northern Australia.

References

Linderniaceae
Monotypic Lamiales genera